Nikaj-Mërtur is a region of the Gjakova Highlands of Northern Albania whose territory is synonymous with the historic Albanian tribes of Mërturi and Nikaj. The region of Nikaj-Mërtur is located in the south-east of the Albanian Alps, bordering the Dukagjin highlands and within the former Tropojë District. The region represents the southern extension of the Highlands of Gjakova. Nikaj shares the same patrilineal descent with most of the Krasniqi tribe, while Mërturi is direct blood relative to the Berisha, which is why it also called Berisha-Mërturi. In 2014, the region was proclaimed as the Nikaj-Mertur Regional Nature Park.

Geography
The Alps' mountain peaks surrounding the area are: Maja e Hekurave, Grykat e Hapta (English: "Open gorges"), Maja e Kakisë, Maja e Ndërmanjës. Qafa e Kolçit connects the area with the neighbouring Krasniqi tribe, while Qafa e Ndërmajës connects the region with the Shala tribe and Qafa e Agrit (1300m) connects it to the wider Dukagjin region. It has an Alpine climate with a robust winter season, plenty of snowfall, and relatively cool summer. The average year-long temperature is 11.5 C, and snow reaches 2570 mm/year. Oak, beech, and pine are predominant in the local flora. The climate and terrain favour livestock. There is also a great potential for mountain tourism.

Geology
The geological composition of the terrain consists of limestone, dolomite, and schist.

Hydrology
Nikaj-Mërtur is a valley trespassed by two rivers: Lumi i Nikajve (English: "Nikaj River") and Lumi i Mërturit (English: "Mërturi River"). The Nikaj River starts in Ndërmanjë valley as Lumi i Zi (English: "Black river"), passes through the Kapiti, Gjonpepaj, and Lekbibaj villages and joins the Mërtur River south-west of Curraj i Poshtëm village. The Mërturi River itself starts in Curraj i Epërm, passes along Mali i Theposur (English: "Sharp mountain") between the villages Shëngjergj and Curraj i Poshtëm, and, after joining the Nikaj River, continues through the villages of Rajë and Tetaj, with the Drin River being its final destination. Both rivers are relatively short.

Administrative division
Administratively, the region falls under Lekbibaj municipality, beside the Rajë village which belongs to the Fierzë municipality. On the east it borders Bujan municipality, Theth in the north, Shalë and Shosh in the west, Fierzë, Pukë and  Fierzë, Tropojë in the south. The area lays within circa 200 km2.

Anthropology

Nikaj
The name Nikaj was recorded in 1671 as Nicagni or Nichagni. The legendary ancestral father of the Nikaj tribe was a herdsman from the Krasniqi tribe called Nikë Mekshi, who left Krasniq around 1550-1600, and settled in the area of Paplekaj i Epërm. This area was said to be the oldest part of Nikaj. Nikë Mekshi was the brother of Kolë Mekshi, who is considered to have been the ancestral father of the Kolmekshaj branch of the Krasniqi tribe. For this reason, members of the Nikaj tribe do not intermarry with them.

In oral tradition, the Nikaj are said to have replaced an early population called the Mavriqi. They were said to have steemed from Vajush near Shkodër and settled in the mountain of Nikaj in the period of 1416-1500. With the spread of Nikaj, most of the earlier inhabitants emigrated to Gusinje, although some of them remained, consequently later being assimilated. This earlier population is associated, in particular, with the settlement of Kapit.

Traveller Edith Durham visited North Albania in the 1900s. She collected the following information about the tribes of Dukagjin, whom she grouped into the Pulati, and then into the two groups of Lower Pulati (or Pulati proper) and those of the Diocese of Pulati. She said that Pulati was hard to define, as the ecclesiastical borders (Diocese of Pulati) extended farther than the Pulati tribes. She described the Nikaj, in the Diocese of Pulati, as:

Mërturi
 
The name Marturi was first recorded as a toponym in 1629. It also called Mërturi-Berisha because they share the same ancestry. The legendary ancestral father of the Mërturi tribe was called Lek Poga, son of Pog Murri and grandson of Murr Detti. His brother Kol Poga, was the ancestral father of the closely related Berisha tribe. Lek Poga, had five sons who settled a various parts of Mërturi: Bib Leka in Shëngjergj, Raja and Mulaj; Ndre Leka in Palç, Apripa and Mërturi i Gurit; Mar Leka in Salca and Brisa; Tet Leka in Markaj, Tetaj and Bëtosha; and Pec Leka in Bëtosha.

The Mërturi and Berisha were initially one tribe and separated in 1520.

Demographics
The Nikaj tribe had a population of some 2,200 in the early years of the 20th century. They were the enemies of the Shala and Shoshi, and were considered, together with the Dushmani, to be among the wildest inhabitants of the northern mountains. The tribe was known for being so warlike among other Albanian tribes that they were feared by them and the Nikaj posed a reputation of not following the tribal law of Lek Dukagjin or its elders. During the late Ottoman period, the tribe of Shala was exclusively Catholic and it was a famous Albanian tribe.

Nikaj-Mërtur region contains the following settlements: Lekbibaj, Gjonpepaj, Peraj, Curraj i Poshtëm, Curraj i Epërm, Qeresh, Kuq, Tetaj, Bëtoshë (Btoshë), Shëngjergj, Salcë, Palçë, Kotec, Brisë, Mulaj, Kapit, Varg (Vark), Shofrran, Paplekaj, Bushat, Mserr, Markaj, and Rajë. The first seven belong to Nikaj clan. Blood feuds and Kanun rules are present in the area.

The population belong mainly to the Catholic rite, with a Muslim minority.

The area presents an interesting toponymy, being pure and totally uninfluenced by Slavic elements, i.e. "Shtegu i Dashit", "Rrasa e Currajve", "Shpella e Lumit", "Qafa e Rrethit", "Qafa e Derzave", "Shpella e Kakverrit", "Rruku i Nikajve", "Kodra Plakë", "Gurrat e Lumit të Zi", "Qafa e Murrizit", "Qafa e T'thermes", "Fusha e Shukut", "Kodra e Palçit", "Guri Murg", "Korja e Mërtuit", "Qafa e Kolcit", "Qafa e Agrit" etc.

Notable people
 Asllan Curri - Albanian Revolutionary
 Bajram Curri - Albanian Revolutionary
 Hysni Curri - Albanian Revolutionary
 Ndoc Nikaj - One of the founder of Shoqnia Bashkimi

See also
List of Albanian tribes
Battle of Agri Pass

Further reading
Nikaj-Mërturi: vështrim historik, Dodë Progni, Zef Doda, "Shtjefni" 2003,

References

External links
Nikaj-Mërturi Region

External links
 Nikaj Merturi: la meraviglia nascosta tra le Alpi albanesi

Tribes of Albania
Tropojë
Historical regions in Albania
Albanian ethnographic regions